George Edward Nurse VC (14 April 1873 – 25 November 1945) was born in Enniskillen, County Fermanagh, Ireland. He was educated in Guernsey in the Channel Islands where both his parents had been born. He was an Irish recipient of the Victoria Cross, the highest award for gallantry in the face of the enemy that can be awarded to British and Commonwealth forces.

Details
Nurse was 26 years old, and a corporal in the 66th Battery, Royal Field Artillery, British Army during the Second Boer War when the following deed took place during the Battle of Colenso for which he was awarded the VC:

Further information
He achieved the rank of lieutenant with the Royal Artillery during World War I. He died in Liverpool on 25 November 1945.

The medal
His Victoria Cross is displayed at the Royal Artillery Museum, Woolwich, London.

See also

 List of Channel Islands Victoria Cross recipients

References

Listed in order of publication year
 The Register of the Victoria Cross (1981, 1988 and 1997)
 
 Ireland's VCs  (Dept of Economic Development, 1995)
 Monuments to Courage (David Harvey, 1999)
 Irish Winners of the Victoria Cross (Richard Doherty & David Truesdale, 2000)
 Liverpool VCs (James Murphy, Pen and Sword Books, 2008)

External links
 Location of grave and VC medal (Liverpool)
 

1873 births
1945 deaths
Military personnel from County Fermanagh
19th-century Irish people
Irish officers in the British Army
Second Boer War recipients of the Victoria Cross
Irish recipients of the Victoria Cross
People from Enniskillen
Royal Artillery officers
British Army personnel of the Second Boer War
British Army personnel of World War I
British Army recipients of the Victoria Cross
People of Guernsey descent
Burials in North West England